
Lynn Harold Loomis (25 April 1915 – 9 June 1994) was an American mathematician working on analysis. Together with Hassler Whitney, he discovered the Loomis–Whitney inequality.

Loomis received his PhD in 1942 from Harvard University under Salomon Bochner with thesis Some Studies on Simply-Connected Riemann Surfaces: I. The Problem of Imbedding II. Mapping on the Boundary for Two Classes of Surfaces. After completing his PhD, Loomis was a professor at Radcliffe College and from 1949 at Harvard. From 1956, he was a member of the American Academy of Arts and Sciences.

Selected works

Articles

with Hassler Whitney:

Books
Introduction to Abstract Harmonic Analysis, Van Nostrand 1953
with Shlomo Sternberg Advanced Calculus, Addison-Wesley 1968 (revised 1990, Jones and Bartlett; reprinted 2014, World Scientific) [a challenging text for (first-year) undergraduate students treating calculus on Banach spaces and differentiable manifolds; see Math 55] 
Introduction to Calculus, Addison-Wesley 1975
Calculus, Addison-Wesley 1974, 1982

Notes

External links

Harvard University alumni
1915 births
1994 deaths
20th-century American mathematicians
Harvard University faculty
Radcliffe College faculty